Guilherme Nunes da Silva (born 12 July 1998), known as Guilherme Nunes or simply Guilherme, is a Brazilian footballer who plays as a defensive midfielder for Brasil de Pelotas.

Club career

Santos
Born in Novo Hamburgo, Rio Grande do Sul, Guilherme joined Santos' youth setup in 2014, from lowly locals Ivoti/Globalfut. On 5 November 2015, he signed a professional three-year contract with the club.

On 3 February 2018, Guilherme was promoted to the first team by manager Jair Ventura. He made his senior debut fifteen days later, coming on as a late substitute for Jonathan Copete in a 1–0 Campeonato Paulista away win against São Paulo.

Guilherme made his Copa Libertadores debut on 15 March 2018, replacing fellow youth graduate Léo Cittadini in a 3–1 win against Nacional at the Pacaembu Stadium. On 2 May, he renewed his contract until May 2023.

On 18 November 2018, Guilherme made his Série A debut, starting in a 2–1 loss at América Mineiro, only lasting nine minutes on the field and being replaced by Renato due to an injury. He appeared in one further league match in the season, again being subbed off due to injury.

On 9 September 2019, Guilherme was loaned to Série B side Paraná until the end of the 2020 Campeonato Paranaense. In November, after only two unused substitute appearances, his loan was cut short until the end of the year, and he subsequently returned to Peixe.

On 27 February 2020, Guilherme joined Portuguesa on loan for the remainder of the Campeonato Paulista Série A2. He scored his first senior goal on 7 September, netting his team's second in a 3–2 away loss against XV de Piracicaba.

Upon returning, Guilherme was again only a backup option before moving on loan to Náutico in the second division on 22 June 2021. On 3 February of the following year, he moved to Ferroviária also in a temporary deal until the end of the 2022 Campeonato Paulista.

On 12 April 2022, Guilherme was loaned to Série C side ABC until the end of the season.

Brasil de Pelotas
On 2 January 2023, Guilherme Nunes moved to Brasil de Pelotas until the end of the 2023 Campeonato Gaúcho.

International career
On 16 September 2015, Guilherme was called up to Brazil under-17s for the year's FIFA U-17 World Cup. He featured for the under-20s the following year, being also called up to complete trainings during the Summer Olympics.

Career statistics

References

External links
Santos FC profile 

1998 births
Living people
People from Novo Hamburgo
Brazilian footballers
Association football midfielders
Campeonato Brasileiro Série A players
Campeonato Brasileiro Série B players
Campeonato Brasileiro Série C players
Santos FC players
Paraná Clube players
Associação Portuguesa de Desportos players
Clube Náutico Capibaribe players
Associação Ferroviária de Esportes players
ABC Futebol Clube players
Grêmio Esportivo Brasil players
Brazil youth international footballers
Brazil under-20 international footballers
Sportspeople from Rio Grande do Sul